Hartleyville is an unincorporated community in Marion Township, Lawrence County, Indiana.

Hartleyville was named for its founder, Charles Hartley.

Geography

References

Unincorporated communities in Lawrence County, Indiana
Unincorporated communities in Indiana